Joan Peñarroya Rodríguez (born 20 April 1969) is a Spanish retired basketball player and current head coach of Baskonia of the Spanish Liga ACB.

Coaching career
Peñarroya started his coaching career as assistant coach with CB Olesa of the Liga EBA. In 2010, he signed with BC Andorra of the LEB Plata. Peñarroya led the team to a promotion to the LEB Oro and later to the Liga ACB. He also coached in the EuroCup with Andorra.

In the 2018–19 season, Peñarroya coached Bàsquet Manresa, leading the team to the ACB playoffs for the first time since 1998.

In July 2019, Peñarroya signed as new head coach of San Pablo Burgos. In October 2020, he won the 2019–20 Basketball Champions League with Burgos, the club's first championship ever. The next season, he led his team to a repeat of the Champions League while also capturing the 2021 FIBA Intercontinental Cup.

On June 21, 2021, he has signed with Valencia Basket of the Liga ACB.

On June 13, 2022, he has signed with Baskonia of the Spanish Liga ACB.

Personal
Joan is the son of Marc Peñarroya, who was a professional basketball player as well.

References

Living people
1969 births
Bàsquet Manresa coaches
Bàsquet Manresa players
BC Andorra coaches
CB Canarias players
CB Miraflores coaches
Club Ourense Baloncesto players
Saski Baskonia coaches
Spanish basketball coaches
Spanish men's basketball players